Michael Joseph Cain (7 July 1885 – 27 August 1951) was a New Zealand rugby union player. A hooker, Cain represented Taranaki at a provincial level, and was a member of the New Zealand national side, the All Blacks, from 1913 to 1914. He played 24 matches for the All Blacks including four internationals. He was selected again for the All Blacks team to tour Australia in 1920, but withdrew.

During World War I, Cain served as a private with the New Zealand Rifle Brigade and saw action in France. Following the end of the war, he played for the New Zealand Services rugby team in both the United Kingdom and South Africa.

Cain died in New Plymouth in 1951, and he was buried in Waitara Cemetery.

References

1885 births
1951 deaths
Burials at Waitara Cemetery
New Zealand international rugby union players
New Zealand military personnel of World War I
New Zealand rugby union players
Rugby union hookers
Rugby union players from Waitara, New Zealand
Taranaki rugby union players